Clayton Charles Guida (born December 8, 1981) is an American professional mixed martial artist, currently signed to the UFC competing in the Lightweight division. A professional competitor since 2003, Guida also formerly competed for Strikeforce, the WEC, King of the Cage, and Shooto. Guida was the inaugural Strikeforce Lightweight Champion.

Background
Born and raised in Illinois into an Italian family, Guida began wrestling at the age of five and was a three-sport athlete at Johnsburg High School. He continued his wrestling career for Harper College, where he competed at 149 lbs. He is the younger brother of fellow mixed martial artist, Jason Guida.

Mixed martial arts career

Early career
Guida made his professional debut in the summer of 2003, losing via rear-naked choke in the first round. After compiling a record of 3-3, he then won his next 15 consecutive fights before losing via submission at a King of the Cage event in February 2006. Guida was then signed by Strikeforce and fought a month later against Josh Thomson for the Strikeforce Lightweight Championship. Guida won via unanimous decision, before losing to the then-undefeated Gilbert Melendez. After losing his next bout overseas in Japan via submission, Guida was signed by Zuffa and the WEC, making his promotional debut at WEC 23. He won via unanimous decision. With an overall record of 20-6, Guida was signed by the UFC.

Ultimate Fighting Championship
Guida was successful in his UFC debut, submitting Justin James in the second round at UFC 64. The submission earned him the Submission of the Night award.

Guida lost a unanimous decision to Din Thomas at UFC Fight Night: Evans vs. Salmon in his second UFC outing.

Guida garnered attention for his three-round split decision loss to Tyson Griffin at UFC 72. Both fighters were awarded the Fight of the Night bonus.

At UFC 74 Guida rebounded from his two consecutive losses, taking a split decision over PRIDE veteran Marcus Aurélio.

Guida was defeated by Roger Huerta at The Ultimate Fighter 6 Finale via rear-naked choke in the 3rd round after clearly winning the first 2 rounds. Both fighters were awarded the Fight of the Night bonus.

Guida returned to his winning ways at UFC Fight Night 13, where he defeated UFC newcomer Samy Schiavo via TKO at 4:15 of the first round.

In a bout at UFC Fight Night 15, he defeated Mac Danzig via unanimous decision (30-27, 29-28, 29-28).

Guida defeated Ultimate Fighter winner Nate Diaz via split decision at UFC 94. Both fighters were awarded the Fight of the Night bonus.

His next fight was against Diego Sanchez, at The Ultimate Fighter: United States vs. United Kingdom Finale which he lost by split decision. The fight had a frantic pace in which Guida weathered a ferocious striking offensive from Sanchez, with a seemingly endless barrage of punches and a brutal headkick which dropped Guida in the first round. This bout went on to win Fight of the Night honors. The fight would later make #13 on the "100 Greatest UFC fights" list.

Despite his status as an up-and-coming UFC fighter he was not included in the UFC 2009 Undisputed video game due to technical issues caused by his long hair. He was even offered $10,000 by Dana White to cut it, but he refused.

On December 12, 2009 he fought Kenny Florian at UFC 107. In the second round of a bloody fight, Guida was dropped by a right hand and lost via rear-naked choke.

Guida was expected to face Sean Sherk on March 21, 2010 at UFC LIVE: Vera vs. Jones, but Sherk was forced off the card with an injury.  Shannon Gugerty stepped up to become Guida's new opponent on the preliminary section of the event.  At UFC Live: Vera vs. Jones Guida defeated Shannon Gugerty at 3:40 of round 2 by way of arm-triangle choke, ending Guida's two fight losing streak along with winning his first UFC Submission of the Night award.

Guida then faced Rafael dos Anjos on August 7, 2010 at UFC 117. Guida appeared to injure the jaw of dos Anjos in the first round with a hook and would go on to defeat dos Anjos by submission (jaw injury) after dos Anjos tapped from the pressure being applied to his jaw while Guida had head-and-arm control.

Guida defeated Takanori Gomi on January 1, 2011 at UFC 125 by submission due to a guillotine choke in round two, his third consecutive submission victory which also earned him Submission of the Night honors.

Guida next defeated former #1 Lightweight contender Anthony Pettis via unanimous decision (30-27, 30-27, 30-27) on June 4, 2011 at The Ultimate Fighter 13 Finale.

Guida faced Benson Henderson on November 12, 2011 at UFC on Fox 1. Guida lost a hard fought decision after three rounds. Both fighters were awarded the Fight of the Night bonus.

Guida faced Gray Maynard on June 22, 2012 at UFC on FX 4. Guida lost to Maynard via split decision .

For his next fight, Guida moved down to the featherweight division and faced Hatsu Hioki on January 26, 2013 at UFC on Fox: Johnson vs. Dodson.  Despite being outstruck by Hioki for the majority of the fight, Guida was able to take Hioki down multiple times using a strong top game and avoid Hioki's submission attempts from the bottom.  Guida defeated Hioki via split decision.

Guida was expected to face Chad Mendes on April 20, 2013 at UFC on Fox 7.  However it was revealed on March 15 that Guida had pulled out of the bout citing an injury.

A rescheduled bout with Mendes took place on August 31, 2013 at UFC 164. After a close first and second round, Guida was defeated by Mendes via TKO by punches, marking the first time ever in his career that he was finished by strikes.

Guida faced Tatsuya Kawajiri at UFC Fight Night 39. He won the fight by unanimous decision, in a performance that earned both participants Fight of the Night honors.

Guida faced Dennis Bermudez on July 26, 2014 at UFC on Fox 12. He lost the bout via submission in the second round.

Guida faced Robbie Peralta on April 4, 2015 at UFC Fight Night 63. He won the fight by unanimous decision.

Guida faced Thiago Tavares on November 7, 2015 at UFC Fight Night 77. He lost the fight due to a guillotine choke submission early in the first round.

Guida faced Brian Ortega on June 4, 2016 at UFC 199. He lost the fight via KO in the third round.

Guida next faced Erik Koch at UFC Fight Night: Chiesa vs. Lee on June 25, 2017. He won the fight by unanimous decision.

Guida faced Joe Lauzon on November 11, 2017 at UFC Fight Night: Poirier vs. Pettis. He won via TKO in the first round.

Guida was expected to face Bobby Green on June 9, 2018 at UFC 225. However, Green pulled out of the bout, citing an injury and was replaced by Charles Oliveira Guida lost the fight via guillotine choke submission in the first round.

Guida next faced former two-division UFC champion B.J. Penn on May 11, 2019 at UFC 237. He won the fight via unanimous decision.

On June 28, 2019 it was announced that the fight between Guida and Diego Sanchez at The Ultimate Fighter 9 Finale, where Sanchez defeat Guida by split decision, on June 20, 2009, will be honored to enter the UFC Hall of Fame during the international fight July 2019.

Guida faced Jim Miller on August 3, 2019 at UFC on ESPN 5. He lost the fight via a technical submission due to a guillotine choke in the first minute of the first round.

Guida faced Bobby Green on June 20, 2020 at UFC Fight Night: Blaydes vs. Volkov. He lost the fight via unanimous decision.

As the first fight of his new, four-fight contract Guida faced Michael Johnson on February 6, 2021 at UFC Fight Night 184. He won the fight via unanimous decision.

Guida faced Mark Madsen on August 21, 2021 at UFC on ESPN 29. He lost the fight via split decision.

Guida faced Leonardo Santos on December 4, 2021 at UFC on ESPN: Font vs. Aldo. Despite nearly being finished with knees and punches in round one, Guida came back and won the fight via rear-naked choke submission in round two.  This win earned him the Performance of the Night award.

Guida faced Claudio Puelles on April 23, 2022 at UFC Fight Night 205. He lost the fight via a kneebar in round one.

Guida faced Scott Holtzman on December 3, 2022 at UFC on ESPN 42. He won the fight via split decision.

Guida is scheduled to face Rafa García on April 15, 2023 at UFC on ESPN 44.

Other combat sports

Guida defeated Billy Quarantillo by unanimous decision in a submission grappling match on December 30, 2021 at Fury Pro Grappling 3.

Guida returned to wrestling competition at the 2022 US Open, competing alongside his teammate Urijah Faber at the event.

On May 28, 2022 Guida competed in the co-main event of Fury Pro Grappling 4, facing Brad Boulton in a submission grappling match. Guida submitted Boulton with an arm-triangle choke at 7:22.

Guida competed in a submission grappling match against fellow UFC fighter Chase Hooper in the co-main event of Fury Pro Grappling 6 on December 30, 2022 and was submitted with a calf slicer at 3:55.

Sponsorship
Clay Guida starred in a National commercial for SafeAuto Insurance. The commercial was filmed in Columbus, Ohio in April 2011. Guida is one of several fighters who represents the SafeAuto Fight Team.

Guida is managed by VFD Sports Marketing, a sports marketing company that focuses on UFC athletes.

Personal life
Guida is a fan of the Chicago Bears and Chicago Cubs. Guida is also a die hard Grateful Dead fan. He attended the GD50 Grateful Dead reunion shows.

Championships and accomplishments
Strikeforce
Strikeforce Lightweight Championship (One time; first)
Ultimate Fighting Championship
Fight of the Night (six times) vs. Tyson Griffin, Roger Huerta, Nate Diaz, Diego Sanchez, Benson Henderson and Tatsuya Kawajiri
Performance of the Night (One time) 
Submission of the Night (three times) vs. Justin James, Shannon Gugerty and Takanori Gomi
Tied (Jeremy Stephens) for fourth most bouts in UFC history (34)
Third most takedowns landed in UFC history (76)
Tied (Jorge Masvidal, Angela Hill and Paul Felder) for most split decision losses in UFC history (4)
Tied for second most split decision wins in UFC history (4)
UFC Hall of Fame (fight wing, class of 2019) vs. Diego Sanchez at The Ultimate Fighter: United States vs. United Kingdom Finale
FIGHT! Magazine
Fight of the Year vs. Roger Huerta (2007)
World MMA Awards
2009 Fight of the Year vs. Diego Sanchez at The Ultimate Fighter: United States vs. United Kingdom Finale
Wrestling Observer Newsletter
Fight of the Year (2009) vs. Diego Sanchez on June 20
Tequila CAZADORES Spirit Award
Tequila CAZADORES Spirit Award (Two times)

Mixed martial arts record 

|-
|Win
|align=center|38–22
|Scott Holtzman
|Decision (split)
|UFC on ESPN: Thompson vs. Holland
|
|align=center|3
|align=center|5:00
|Orlando, Florida, United States
|
|-
|Loss
|align=center|37–22
|Claudio Puelles
|Submission (kneebar)
|UFC Fight Night: Lemos vs. Andrade
|
|align=center|1
|align=center|3:01
|Las Vegas, Nevada, United States
|
|-
|Win
|align=center|37–21
|Leonardo Santos
|Submission (rear-naked choke)
|UFC on ESPN: Font vs. Aldo 
|
|align=center|2
|align=center|1:21
|Las Vegas, Nevada, United States
|
|-
|Loss
|align=center|36–21
|Mark Madsen
|Decision (split)
|UFC on ESPN: Cannonier vs. Gastelum 
|
|align=center|3
|align=center|5:00
|Las Vegas, Nevada, United States
|
|-
|Win
|align=center|36–20
|Michael Johnson
|Decision (unanimous) 
|UFC Fight Night: Overeem vs. Volkov
|
|align=center|3
|align=center|5:00
|Las Vegas, Nevada, United States
|
|-
|Loss
|align=center|35–20
|Bobby Green
|Decision (unanimous)
|UFC on ESPN: Blaydes vs. Volkov 
|
|align=center|3
|align=center|5:00
|Las Vegas, Nevada, United States
|
|-
|Loss
|align=center|35–19
|Jim Miller
|Technical Submission (guillotine choke)
|UFC on ESPN: Covington vs. Lawler
|
|align=center|1
|align=center|0:58
|Newark, New Jersey, United States
|
|-
|Win
|align=center|35–18
|B.J. Penn
|Decision (unanimous)
|UFC 237
|
|align=center|3
|align=center|5:00
|Rio de Janeiro, Brazil
|
|-
|Loss
|align=center|34–18
|Charles Oliveira
|Submission (guillotine choke)
|UFC 225
|
|align=center|1
|align=center|2:28
|Chicago, Illinois, United States
| 
|-
|Win
|align=center|34–17
|Joe Lauzon
|TKO (punches and elbows)
|UFC Fight Night: Poirier vs. Pettis
|
|align=center|1
|align=center|1:07
|Norfolk, Virginia, United States
|
|-
|Win
|align=center|33–17
|Erik Koch
|Decision (unanimous)
|UFC Fight Night: Chiesa vs. Lee
|
|align=center|3
|align=center|5:00
|Oklahoma City, Oklahoma, United States
|
|-
|Loss
|align=center|32–17
|Brian Ortega
|KO (knee)
|UFC 199
|
|align=center|3
|align=center|4:40
|Inglewood, California, United States
|  
|-
|Loss
|align=center|32–16
|Thiago Tavares
|Submission (guillotine choke)
|UFC Fight Night: Belfort vs. Henderson 3
|
|align=center| 1
|align=center| 0:39
|São Paulo, Brazil
|
|-
|Win
|align=center|32–15
|Robbie Peralta
|Decision (unanimous)
|UFC Fight Night: Mendes vs. Lamas
|
|align=center|3
|align=center|5:00
|Fairfax, Virginia, United States
|
|-
| Loss
| align=center| 31–15
| Dennis Bermudez
| Submission (rear-naked choke)
| UFC on Fox: Lawler vs. Brown
| 
| align=center| 2
| align=center| 2:57
| San Jose, California, United States
| 
|-
| Win
| align=center| 31–14
| Tatsuya Kawajiri
| Decision (unanimous)
| UFC Fight Night: Nogueira vs. Nelson
| 
| align=center| 3
| align=center| 5:00
| Abu Dhabi, United Arab Emirates
| 
|-
| Loss
| align=center| 30–14
| Chad Mendes 
| TKO (punches)
| UFC 164
| 
| align=center| 3
| align=center| 0:30
| Milwaukee, Wisconsin, United States
| 
|-
| Win
| align=center| 30–13
| Hatsu Hioki 
| Decision (split) 
| UFC on Fox: Johnson vs. Dodson
| 
| align=center| 3
| align=center| 5:00
| Chicago, Illinois, United States
| 
|-
| Loss
| align=center| 29–13
| Gray Maynard 
| Decision (split)
| UFC on FX: Maynard vs. Guida
| 
| align=center| 5
| align=center| 5:00
| Atlantic City, New Jersey, United States
| 
|-
| Loss
| align=center| 29–12
| Benson Henderson 
| Decision (unanimous)
| UFC on Fox: Velasquez vs. dos Santos
| 
| align=center| 3
| align=center| 5:00
| Anaheim, California, United States
| 
|-
| Win
| align=center| 29–11
| Anthony Pettis
| Decision (unanimous)
| The Ultimate Fighter: Team Lesnar vs. Team dos Santos Finale
| 
| align=center| 3
| align=center| 5:00
| Las Vegas, Nevada, United States
| 
|-
| Win
| align=center| 28–11
| Takanori Gomi
| Submission (guillotine choke)
| UFC 125
| 
| align=center| 2
| align=center| 4:27
| Las Vegas, Nevada, United States
| 
|-
| Win
| align=center| 27–11
| Rafael dos Anjos
| TKO (jaw injury)
| UFC 117
| 
| align=center| 3
| align=center| 1:51
| Oakland, California, United States
| 
|-
| Win
| align=center| 26–11
| Shannon Gugerty
| Submission (arm-triangle choke)
| UFC Live: Vera vs. Jones
| 
| align=center| 2
| align=center| 3:40
| Broomfield, Colorado, United States
| 
|-
| Loss
| align=center| 25–11
| Kenny Florian
| Submission (rear-naked choke)
| UFC 107
| 
| align=center| 2
| align=center| 2:19
| Memphis, Tennessee, United States
| 
|-
| Loss
| align=center| 25–10
| Diego Sanchez
| Decision (split)
| The Ultimate Fighter: United States vs. United Kingdom Finale
| 
| align=center| 3
| align=center| 5:00
| Las Vegas, Nevada, United States
| 
|-
| Win
| align=center| 25–9
| Nate Diaz
| Decision (split)
| UFC 94
| 
| align=center| 3
| align=center| 5:00
| Las Vegas, Nevada, United States
| 
|-
| Win
| align=center| 24–9
| Mac Danzig
| Decision (unanimous)
| UFC Fight Night: Diaz vs. Neer
| 
| align=center| 3
| align=center| 5:00
| Omaha, Nebraska, United States
| 
|-
| Win
| align=center| 23–9
| Samy Schiavo
| TKO (punches)
| UFC Fight Night: Florian vs. Lauzon
| 
| align=center| 1
| align=center| 4:15
| Broomfield, Colorado, United States
| 
|-
| Loss
| align=center| 22–9
| Roger Huerta
| Submission (rear-naked choke)
| The Ultimate Fighter: Team Hughes vs. Team Serra Finale
| 
| align=center| 3
| align=center| 0:51
| Las Vegas, Nevada, United States
| 
|-
| Win
| align=center| 22–8
| Marcus Aurélio
| Decision (split)
| UFC 74
| 
| align=center| 3
| align=center| 5:00
| Las Vegas, Nevada, United States
| 
|-
| Loss
| align=center| 21–8
| Tyson Griffin
| Decision (split)
| UFC 72
| 
| align=center| 3
| align=center| 5:00
| Belfast, Northern Ireland
| 
|-
| Loss
| align=center| 21–7
| Din Thomas
| Decision (unanimous)
| UFC Fight Night: Evans vs. Salmon
| 
| align=center| 3
| align=center| 5:00
| Hollywood, Florida, United States
| 
|-
| Win
| align=center| 21–6
| Justin James
| Submission (rear-naked choke)
| UFC 64
| 
| align=center| 2
| align=center| 4:42
| Las Vegas, Nevada, United States
| 
|-
| Win
| align=center| 20–6
| Joe Martin
| Decision (unanimous)
| WEC 23
| 
| align=center| 3
| align=center| 5:00
| Lemoore, California, United States
| 
|-
| Loss
| align=center| 19–6
| Yusuke Endo
| Submission (armbar)
| Shooto 2006: 7/21 in Korakuen Hall
| 
| align=center| 1
| align=center| 2:47
| Tokyo, Japan
| 
|-
| Loss
| align=center| 19–5
| Gilbert Melendez
| Decision (split)
| Strikeforce: Revenge
| 
| align=center| 5
| align=center| 5:00
| San Jose, California, United States
| 
|-
| Win
| align=center| 19–4
| Josh Thomson
| Decision (unanimous)
| Strikeforce: Shamrock vs. Gracie
| 
| align=center| 5
| align=center| 5:00
| San Jose, California, United States
| 
|-
| Loss
| align=center| 18–4
| Tristan Yunker
| Submission (rear-naked choke) 
| KOTC: Redemption on the River 
| 
| align=center| 1
| align=center| 1:17
| Moline, Illinois, United States
| 
|-
| Win
| align=center| 18–3
| Joe Jordan
| Decision (unanimous)
| Xtreme Fighting Organization 8
| 
| align=center| 3
| align=center| 5:00
| Lakemoor, Illinois, United States
| 
|-
| Win
| align=center| 17–3
| Jeff Carsten
| TKO (injury)
| Ironheart Crown 9: Purgatory
| 
| align=center| 1
| align=center| 3:01
| Hammond, Indiana, United States
| 
|-
| Win
| align=center| 16–3
| Dave Cochran
| Submission (rear-naked choke)
| KOTC: Xtreme Edge
| 
| align=center| 1
| align=center| 2:26
| Indianapolis, Indiana, United States
| 
|-
| Win
| align=center| 15–3
| John Strawn
| Submission (arm-triangle choke)
| Xtreme Fighting Organization 7
| 
| align=center| 2
| align=center| 3:12
| Island Lake, Illinois, United States
| 
|-
| Win
| align=center| 14–3
| Jay Estrada
| Submission (rear-naked choke)
| Combat Do Fighting Challenge 4
| 
| align=center| 1
| align=center| 3:42
| Cicero, Illinois, United States
| 
|-
| Win
| align=center| 13–3
| Bart Palaszewski
| Decision (unanimous)
| Xtreme Fighting Organization 6: Judgement Day
| 
| align=center| 3
| align=center| 5:00
| Lakemoor, Illinois, United States
| 
|-
| Win
| align=center| 12–3
| Alonzo Martinez
| Submission (arm-triangle choke)
|rowspan=2 | Xtreme Kage Kombat: Des Moines
|rowspan=2 | 
| align=center| 3
| align=center| 3:22
|rowspan=2 | Des Moines, Iowa, United States
| 
|-
| Win
| align=center| 11–3
| Chris Mickle
| Decision (unanimous) 
| align=center| 3
| align=center| 5:00
| 
|-
| Win
| align=center| 10–3
| Alex Carter
| Submission (punches) 
| Combat Do Fighting Challenge 3
| 
| align=center| 1
| align=center| 2:54
| Cicero, Illinois, United States
| 
|-
| Win
| align=center| 9–3
| Brandon Adamson
| Submission (rear-naked choke)
| Xtreme Fighting Organization 5
| 
| align=center| 1
| align=center| 3:02
| Lakemoor, Illinois, United States
| 
|-
| Win
| align=center| 8–3
| Billy Guardiola
| Submission (ankle lock)
| Combat Do Fighting Challenge 2
| 
| align=center| 1
| align=center| N/A
| Cicero, Illinois, United States
| 
|-
| Win
| align=center| 7–3
| Dennis Davis
| KO (knee) 
| MMA Mexico Day 2
| 
| align=center| 1
| align=center| N/A
| Ciudad Juárez, Mexico
| 
|-
| Win
| align=center| 6–3
| Vito Woods
| Submission (guillotine choke)
| Xtreme Fighting Organization 4
| 
| align=center| 2
| align=center| 1:19
| McHenry, Illinois, United States
| 
|-
| Win
| align=center| 5–3
| Randy Hauer
| TKO (punches) 
| Extreme Challenge 60
| 
| align=center| 1
| align=center| 2:25
| Medina, Minnesota, United States
| 
|-
| Win
| align=center| 4–3
| Billy Guardiola
| Submission (ankle lock)
| Combat Do Fighting Challenge 1
| 
| align=center| 1
| align=center| N/A
| Cicero, Illinois, United States
| 
|-
| Loss
| align=center| 3–3
| Gabe Lemley
| Submission (armbar)
| Xtreme Fighting Organization 2: New Blood
| 
| align=center| 2
| align=center| 0:33
| Fontana, Wisconsin, United States
| 
|-
| Win
| align=center| 3–2
| Jed Deno
| Submission (choke)
| Ultimate Combat Sports 2: Battle at the Barn
| 
| align=center| 1
| align=center| 3:35
| Rochester, Minnesota, United States
| 
|-
| Win
| align=center| 2–2
| Shawn Nolan
| N/A
|rowspan=2 | Xtreme Kage Kombat: Clash in Curtiss 5
|rowspan=2 | 
| align=center| N/A
| align=center| N/A
|rowspan=2 | Curtiss, Wisconsin, United States
| 
|-
| Loss
| align=center| 1–2
| Dan Duke 
| N/A
| align=center| N/A
| align=center| N/A
| 
|-
| Win
| align=center| 1–1
| Adam Bass
| Submission (rear-naked choke)
| Xtreme Fighting Organization 1: The Kickoff
| 
| align=center| 1
| align=center| 2:53
| Lake Geneva, Wisconsin, United States
| 
|-
| Loss
| align=center| 0–1
| Adam Copenhaver
| Submission (rear-naked choke)
| Silverback Classic 17
| 
| align=center| 1
| align=center| N/A
| Ottawa, Illinois, United States
|

Grappling record

See also
 List of current UFC fighters
 List of male mixed martial artists

References

External links 

 
 
 

American male mixed martial artists
American people of Italian descent
Mixed martial artists from Illinois
Lightweight mixed martial artists
Mixed martial artists utilizing collegiate wrestling
Strikeforce (mixed martial arts) champions
1981 births
Living people
People from Lake County, Illinois
People from Johnsburg, Illinois
Ultimate Fighting Championship male fighters
American male sport wrestlers
Amateur wrestlers